Brazoria enquistii is a plant species in the family Lamiaceae. It is a rare plant known only from three counties in central Texas (Mason, Llano, Burnet).

References

Lamiaceae
Endemic flora of Texas
Plants described in 2003